Shurparaka (also spelt Surparaka) was a kingdom founded by Bhargava Rama (also known as Parashurama) near the Western sea, close to the mouth of the river Narmada in India. It is mentioned in the epic Mahabharata. Parashurama gave this kingdom to the Brahmin rulers of Kashyapa clan. Shurparaka is identified with medieval Sopara and modern day Nala Sopara.

References in Mahabharata

The Ocean created for Jamadagni’s son (Bhargava Rama), a region called Shurparaka (12:49). Having made the earth destitute of Kshatriyas for thrice seven times, the puissant Bhargava, on completion of a horse-sacrifice, gave away the earth as sacrificial present to Kashyapa. Kashyapa, having accepted the earth in gift, made a present of it to the Brahmanas, entered the great forest.

This gave rise to the myth of Parashurama, reclaiming the land from the sea. The people of Shurparaka brought this myth to Kerala where this myth still exists.

The pilgrimage in Shurparaka

One should proceed to Shurparaka, where Jamadagni’s son had formerly dwelt. Bathing in that tirtha of Rama, one acquireth the merit of giving away gold in abundance. (3:85). In the tirtha called Shurparaka are two sacrificial platforms of the illustrious Jamadagni, called Pashana and Punaschandra (3:88). Yudhishthira plunged his body in all the holy spots, and then came again to Shurparaka (3:118). Bathing in the Narmada as also in the tirtha known by the name of Shurparaka, observing a fast for a full fortnight, one is sure to become in one's next birth a prince of the royal line. (13:25).

Sahadeva's Expedition to south 

Having brought king Nila of Avanti under his sway the victorious son of Madri, viz. Sahadeva, then went further towards the south. He then brought the king of Tripura under his sway. And next turning his forces against the Paurava kingdom, he vanquished and reduced to subjection the monarch thereof. And the prince, after this, with great efforts brought Akriti, the king of Saurashtra and preceptor of the Kausikas under his sway. The virtuous prince, while staying in the kingdom of Saurashtra sent an ambassador unto king Rukmin the son of Bhishmaka within the territories of Bhojakata.  And the monarch cheerfully accepted the sway of the son of Pandu. The master of battle then, having exacted jewels and wealth from king Rukmin, marched further to the south. And, endued with great energy and great strength, the hero then, reduced to subjection, Shurparaka and Talakata, and the Dandakas also (2:30).

References in Mahavamsa

The Mahavamsa, the Sri Lankan Pali chronicle, mentions that the legendary founder of the Sinhalese, prince Vijaya, left his homeland of Lala and landed first in Suppāraka (the Pali form of the Sanskrit 'Shurparaka'), identified with modern Sopara, in Palgar district north of Mumbai.

See also 

Kingdoms of Ancient India
Kerala

References 
 Mahabharata of Krishna Dwaipayana Vyasa, translated to English by Kisari Mohan Ganguli

Kingdoms in the Mahabharata